Malek Miladi (born 24 December 1996) is a Tunisian footballer who plays as a defender for Al-Safa.

References

External links
 

1995 births
Living people
Tunisian footballers
Tunisian expatriate footballers
Espérance Sportive de Tunis players
EO Sidi Bouzid players
US Ben Guerdane players
CO Médenine players
US Tataouine players
Arar FC players
Al-Nasr SC (Benghazi) players
Al Safa FC players
Tunisian Ligue Professionnelle 1 players
Saudi First Division League players
Saudi Second Division players
Expatriate footballers in Saudi Arabia
Expatriate footballers in Libya
Tunisian expatriate sportspeople in Saudi Arabia
Tunisian expatriate sportspeople in Libya
Association football defenders